Boogie is a 2008 Romanian film written and directed by Radu Muntean.

Plot
On his spring break at the seaside, with his wife and his four-year-old son, Bogdan Ciocăzanu (a.k.a. Boogie) runs into his best friends from high-school at the precise date and time that reminds all of them of their most glorious drinking trips and sexual escapades of their younger days. Frustrated that, between his job and his family, time is no longer his to manage and play with, Boogie now takes his shock dosage of freedom and spends a night to tick off all the items on the map of his youth (drinking, games, flirting, prostitutes). In the morning, after the disillusionment of the remake he experiences with his former friends, he returns to his wife.

Cast
 Dragoş Bucur as Bogdan Ciocăzanu
 Anamaria Marinca as Smaranda Ciocăzanu
 Mimi Brănescu as Penescu
 Adrian Vancica as Iordache
 Vlad Muntean as Adrian Ciocăzanu
 Geanina Varga as Roxana
 Maria Alexandra Birleanu as Waitress
 Renee Harbek as Herself

Release
The film premiered at the 2008 Cannes Film Festival and subsequently participated in the Karlovy Vary International Film Festival.

See also
 Romanian New Wave

References

External links
 
 

2008 films
Films directed by Radu Muntean
Romanian comedy-drama films
2000s Romanian-language films